XXI (formerly, A Feast for Kings (AFFK)) is an American Christian metal band that also takes influences from Alternative metal and Post-hardcore. They come from Carrollton, Kentucky, where they were formed in 2010, with lead vocalist Eric Gentry. Eric's death in 2014 was the reasoning behind the band's name change, with 'XXI' (Roman numerals for '21') being Eric's age at the time of his death. Their first extended play, Hell on Earth, was released in 2014, shortly before Eric's death, and under their former name. The debut studio album, Inside Out, was released with Carson Butcher as lead vocalist on Tooth & Nail Records in 2015. This album was their breakthrough album on both the Billboard magazine Christian Albums and Heatseekers Albums charts.

Background
The band is from Carrollton, Kentucky, where they formed in 2010 under the name A Feast for Kings, with their members being lead vocalist, Eric Gentry; background vocalist and guitarist, Seth Weigand; guitarist, Jamie King; bassist, Robbie Barnett; and drummer Carson Butcher. After Gentry's death, the group changed their name to XXI to memorialize his age at his time of death. Their drummer went on to become their lead vocalist, and the bassist took over on the drums.

History
The band commenced as a musical entity in 2010, with their first extended play, Hell on Earth, which was released on April 17, 2014, as A Feast for Kings.  Their second release, Inside Out, a studio album, was released on September 18, 2015, with Tooth & Nail Records. This album was their breakthrough release upon the Billboard magazine charts, where it placed at No. 20 on the Christian Albums, and No. 19 on the Heatseekers Albums.

Band members

Current members
 Carson Butcher - vocals (2014–present) drums (2010-2014)
 Seth Weigand - lead guitar, vocals (2010–present)
 Jamie King - rhythm guitar (2010–present)
 Christian Madrinich - drums (2016–present)

Former Members
 Eric Gentry - vocals (2010-2014, died 2014)
 Robbie Barnett - bass guitar (2010-2016), drums (2014-2016)
 Scott Chappell - guitar (2010-2014)
 Colin Loderhose - drums (2016)
Timeline

Discography
Studio albums

Independent albums
 Hell on Earth - EP (April 17, 2014, as A Feast for Kings)

References

External links
 Facebook page

Musical groups from Kentucky
Christian rock groups from Kentucky
2010 establishments in Kentucky
Musical groups established in 2010
Tooth & Nail Records artists